Sturgeon is a surname. Notable people with the surname include:
 Al Sturgeon (born 1956), American politician from Iowa
 Barbara Sturgeon, British broadcaster
 Bobby Sturgeon (1919–2007), American baseball infielder 
 Cecil Sturgeon (1919–1972), American football offensive tackle
 Daniel Sturgeon (1789–1878), American physician, banker, and politician from Pennsylvania
 Fábio Sturgeon (born 1994), Portuguese footballer
 Henry Sturgeon (died 1814), British Army officer of the Napoleonic Wars
 Lyle Sturgeon (1914–1958), Canadian-born American football tackle
 Michael Sturgeon (born 1958), English cricketer
 Nicola Sturgeon (born 1970), Scottish politician and First Minister of Scotland
 Peter Sturgeon (born 1954), Canadian ice hockey player
 Peter A. Sturgeon (1916-2005), American scholar
 Rollin S. Sturgeon (1877–1961), American silent film director
 Sylvester Sturgeon (1886–1930), English cricketer
 Theodore Sturgeon (1918–1985), American science fiction author
 William Sturgeon (1783–1850), English physicist and inventor who made the first electromagnets

See also

English-language surnames